Flemish Market and Washing Place is an oil on canvas painting by Flemish painter Joos de Momper. It was painted in the 1620s, and it might be a collaboration between de Momper and Jan Brueghel the Elder

Painting
The painting is a blend of landscape painting and genre painting. It shows a scene of rural life typical of Flanders. The people are spreading cloth on a bleachfield, an open area used for spreading woven fabrics on the ground, in order to purify and whiten them by the action of the sunlight.

Bleachfields were also common in northern England, whereto the Flemings migrated in large numbers throughout the medieval and early modern periods; for instance, the name of the town of Whitefield, on the outskirts of Manchester, is thought to derive from the medieval bleachfields used by Flemish settlers.

To the left, the painting depicts a bustling town market. There is a pleasant contrast between the animated, hectic market and the placid bleachfield; as well as between the former and the elevated sky.

The painting is currently housed at the Museum of Prado, in Madrid. It was part of the Royal Collection since at least the early 18th century, when it was housed at the Zarzuela Palace.

References

Further reading
 Díaz Padrón, Matías. Recchiuto, Alberto, Application of X-rays to the study of some paintings in the Prado Museum, Medica Mundi. A review of modern radiology and medical electronics, 18, 1973, pp. 98-106.
 Díaz Padrón, Matías, Dos lienzos de Joost de Momper atribuidos a Brueghel en el Museo del Prado, Archivo Español de Arte, 48, 1975, pp. 271.
 Museo Nacional del Prado, Museo del Prado: catálogo de pinturas. Escuela flamenca Siglo XVII / por Matías Díaz Padrón, Museo del Prado. Patrimonio Nacional de Museos, Madrid, 1975, pp. 198.
 Ertz, Klaus, Josse de Momper Der Jungere. 1564-1635. Die Gemalde Mit Krit, Luca, Freren, 1986, pp. 55,202,571/ lám.217.
 Museo Nacional del Prado, La pintura flamenca en el Prado, IbercajaFonds Mercator, Madrid, 1989, pp. 138.
 Díaz Padrón, Matías, El siglo de Rubens en el Museo del Prado: catálogo razonado, Prensa Ibérica, Barcelona, 1995, pp. 254.
 Honig, Elizabeth Alice, Painting & the Market in Early Modern Antwerp, Yale University Press, Yale, 1998, pp. 12.
 Ertz, Klaus, Jan Brueghel der Ältere (1568-1625): kritischer katalog der Gemälde, Luca Verlag, Lingen, 2008.
 Posada Kubissa, Teresa, El paisaje nórdico en el Prado. Rubens, Brueghel, Lorena, Museo Nacional del Prado, Madrid, 2011, pp. 78-79, 159 / 20.
 Joost de Momper, cat. exp., Amsterdam, 1930.
 Vlieghe, Hans, Arte y arquitectura flamenca 1585-1700, Madrid, Cátedra, 2000, pp. 287-289.
 Díaz Padrón, Matías, El siglo de Rubens en el Museo del Prado. Catálogo razonado de pintura flamenca del siglo XVII, Barcelona, Editorial Prensa Ibérica, y Madrid, Museo del Prado, 1995, p. 751.
 Ertz, Klaus, Joos de Momper der Jüngere. Die Gemälde mi kritischem Oeuvrekatalog, Freren, Luca Verlag, 1986.
 Thiéry, Yvonne, y Kervyn de Meerendré, Michel, Les peintres flamands de paysage au XVIIe siècle: des précurseurs à Rubens, Bruselas, Éditions d'Art * * * Lefèbvre et Gillet, 1953, pp. 138-161.

External links
 The painting at the Museum of Prado
 The painting at the Netherlands Institute for Art History
 The painting at the Web Gallery of Art

1620s paintings
Paintings of the Museo del Prado by Flemish artists
Landscape paintings
Paintings by Joos de Momper